The Thing with Two Heads is a 1972 American blaxploitation science fiction comedy film directed by Lee Frost and starring Ray Milland, Rosey Grier, Don Marshall, Roger Perry, Kathy Baumann, and Chelsea Brown.

Plot
Dr. Maxwell Kirshner (Ray Milland) arrives at a mansion as a passenger in a wheelchair; once inside Kirshner asks if his experiment has been a success, and is told by an orderly that it has been. He is taken to the basement, where the experiment is in fact a two-headed gorilla (Rick Baker) that Dr. Kirshner has created. The experiment is to determine whether two heads can survive on a single body. Dr. Kirshner has done this because he has not much longer to live and wants to transplant his still living head from his lifeless body onto a donor so that he may continue living and continue working as the world's most successful surgeon.

Dr. Kirshner returns to his hospital institute to oversee an operation performed by his close friend and associate doctor, Phillip Desmond (Roger Perry). Dr. Kirshner returns to the basement and his two headed gorilla to remove one of the heads from its body. Kirshner orders his assistants to sedate his creature, but plans go awry when the creature is upset about the needle and knocks Dr. Kirshner out of his wheelchair, hurting him badly. It then proceeds to smash up the lab and escapes. The creature runs away and into a supermarket, chased by the assistants, where he is caught.

Kirshner hires a new doctor, Fred Williams (Don Marshall), to help Desmond but when he discovers that Dr. Williams is African-American he tells Williams that he is no longer needed, to which Williams takes great offense.

Dr. Kirshner successfully removes the second head of the creature, and tells Desmond he is ready for his own transplant to a healthy donor. Desmond is not sure, until Kirshner tells him that the head that is now on the gorilla is in fact the second head he put on. He had successfully removed the original gorilla's head and replaced it with the second transplanted one.

Meanwhile, on death row, convicts are told that donating their bodies to science will save them from the electric chair. One convict is led to the chair - an African-American himself, named Jack Moss (Roosevelt "Rosey" Grier) - and he decides to volunteer for the science experiment because he is innocent of the crime he was supposed to have committed.  The police, including Sergeant Hacker (Roger Gentry), escort Jack to the transplant center for this experiment they have been told about. The doctors are surprised to see a large African-American being brought before them for this experiment, knowing full well that when Kirshner wakes up, he is not going to like what he sees. However, the doctors work around the clock to transplant Dr Kirshner's head onto Jack's body.

After the operation, Kirshner wakes up, and Desmond tells him that the operation was a success.  Desmond tells him that they had no other choice but to transplant his head onto the African-American's body, and that he would not have lived another day if they had not operated when they did.

At that moment, Jack awakens and is angry and disturbed that Kirshner's head is on his body and tries to get up from the table, but Kirshner cries out for someone to sedate Jack, which Desmond does.  Desmond tells him that he will keep the 'Jack' side heavily sedated all the time while Kirshner regains the power to move the body. Leaving Kirshner to rest, Desmond meets up with Dr. Williams again and tells him he needs his help. Williams is reluctant at first, but Desmond reassures him that his beliefs are not the same as Dr. Kirshner's and that his help is very much needed.

Meanwhile, a nurse (Britt Nilsson) comes to administer a sedative to Jack's side of the body. Jack tricks the nurse into thinking he is asleep, and then injects her with the sedative instead and escapes, taking Williams with him/them. Williams drives the car under gunpoint by Jack and Desmond chases after them. Jack asks Williams if he can remove Kirshner's head from his body. Jack takes over driving and accidentally crashes the car, resulting in a flat tire. Kirshner then tries to appeal to Williams by offering him the accolades he has received by performing a successful transplant. Williams refuses the offer, as it would mean that he would have to remove Jack's head.

Jack goes to his wife's house; Lila (Chelsea Brown) is not that pleased to see him because of Kirshner's head on his body. While Jack is sleeping, Kirshner finds out that he can now control the body almost fully. Jack, Kirshner, Williams and Lila sit down for dinner. Lila asks what it will take to take Kirshner's head from Jack's body. Kirshner tells her that without a specially crafted surgical team, it is impossible to do the operation and both of them will die. Williams tells Kirshner that he is dead wrong about that, as the removal procedure is easily done without the aid of the surgical team.

Williams drives to a medical warehouse to get what he needs for the operation. Frightened by what Williams has told him, Kirshner manages to take over Jack's body and starts playing around with his face. Jack asks him to stop it and Kirshner knocks out Jack by punching him in the face. Cornered by William, Kirshner calls Desmond for help in removing Jack's head so that he may live. Kirshner manages to get away and drives back to the basement of his house. Before Kirshner can sedate Jack, Williams comes in and stops him. Williams then calls Desmond to get over to Kirshner's house as soon as possible. Desmond arrives with a nurse and an associate, who find Kirshner's detached head lying on the utensil table, hooked up to a heart and lung machine which has his blood constantly pumping through the plastic tubes to keep him alive for a while. Kirshner calls to Desmond and begs for him to bring him another body.

The film ends with Lila, Jack and Dr. Williams driving down the highway singing "Oh Happy Day."

Cast
 Ray Milland as Dr. Maxwell Kirshner
 Rosey Grier as Jack Moss
 Don Marshall as Dr. Fred Williams
 Roger Perry as Dr. Philip Desmond
 Kathy Baumann as Patricia
 Chelsea Brown as Lila Moss
 John Dullaghan as Thomas
 John Bliss as Donald
 Jane Kellem as Miss Mullen
 Rod Steele as Medical Salesman
 Lee Frost as Sergeant Hacker
 Wes Bishop as Dr. Smith
 Rick Baker as Gorilla

Production
The movie is known for its soundtrack, produced by MGM Records producer Michael Viner with a rotating cast of studio musicians that he called the Incredible Bongo Band. Some early makeup work from future Oscar winner Rick Baker were also featured.

Release
The Thing with Two Heads was released in theatres on July 19, 1972. The film was released on DVD on June 5, 2001 and June 23, 2015.

Reception
Variety called the film "slickly imaginative" and praised the "excellent special effects." Roger Ebert gave the film one star out of four. Gene Siskel of the Chicago Tribune gave it two stars out of four, writing that after the operation, the thing "seems to exist only to be chased," adding, "Only the film's occasional humor keeps one in one's seat." Kevin Thomas of the Los Angeles Times called the film "every bit as preposterous as it sounds. It is also utterly hilarious, and any picture that can point up the absurdity and cruelty of racial prejudice with such incessant laughter deserves respect. Indeed, this American International release is a well-calculated, competently made exploitation picture that offers lots of fun." Tom Shales of The Washington Post wrote that it "isn't terrible," but "As the title implies, 'The Thing with Two Heads' can't make up its mind. It's a horror movie. It's a comedy movie. Neither breath mint nor candy mint, the picture never becomes quite horrifying or comic enough." Geoff Brown of The Monthly Film Bulletin wrote that the two lead actors both gave "convincing performances" but wished that the filmmakers had done more with the premise, finding that the extended chase sequence "takes too much attention away from the movie's extraordinary hero."

In popular culture
 In The Simpsons episode "Treehouse of Horror XXIV", the plot of the "Dead and Shoulders" story borrows the premise from the film where Bart Simpson's head is grafted onto Lisa Simpson's body. It had previously been referenced at the end of "Treehouse of Horror II", in which Mr. Burns' head was grafted onto Homer Simpson's body at the end of the "If I Only Had a Brain" segment.
 In the first act of the Justice League Unlimited episode "Divided We Fall", The Flash jokingly mentions the film to refer to the grotesque fusion between Lex Luthor and Brainiac.

See also
 The Incredible 2-Headed Transplant - An earlier film with a similar plot.
 List of American films of 1972

References

External links
 
 
 The Thing with Two Heads at Trailers from Hell
 The Thing with Two Heads at Grindhouse Database

1972 films
1972 horror films
1970s comedy horror films
1970s science fiction films
African-American films
American science fiction comedy films
American International Pictures films
Blaxploitation films
Films directed by Lee Frost
Films scored by Robert O. Ragland
Films about organ transplantation
1972 comedy films
Mad scientist films
African-American horror films
1970s English-language films
1970s American films